In Australian parliamentary practice, the Opposition consists of the second largest party or coalition of parties in the Australian House of Representatives, with its leader being given the title "Leader of the Opposition". The Opposition serves the same function as the official opposition in other Commonwealth of Nations monarchies that follow the Westminster conventions and practices. It is seen as the alternative government and the existing administration's main opponent in the Australian Parliament and at a general election. By convention, the Opposition Leader in the federal Parliament comes from the House of Representatives, as does the deputy, although the Government and Opposition may also both have leaders in the Senate. The Opposition is sometimes styled as His Majesty's Loyal Opposition to show that, although the group may be against the sitting government, it remains loyal to the Crown (the embodiment of the Australian state), and thus to Australia.

The current Opposition at a federal level is the centre-right Liberal Party/National Party Coalition, led by Peter Dutton.

State and territory opposition
The Opposition parties and leaders of Australian States and Territories are:

See also
 List of federal Opposition Leaders
 Shadow Ministry of Australia

References

Politics of Australia
Australia